Aethiopian, Æthiopian, Æthiopic or Ethiopian Sea or Ocean ( or Oceanus Æthiopicus) was the name given to the southern half of the Atlantic Ocean in classical geographical works. The name appeared in maps from ancient times up to the turn of the 19th century.

Geography

The originally Greek term Okeanos Aithiopos is an old name for what is now called the South Atlantic Ocean. It is separated from the North Atlantic Ocean by a narrow region between Natal, Brazil and Monrovia, Liberia. The term Ethiopian Ocean appeared until the mid-19th century, for example on the map Accuratissima Totius Africae in Lucem Producta, engraved by Johann Baptist Homann and Frederick de Wit and published by Jacob von Sandrart in Nürnberg in 1702.

The name Aethiopian was related to the fact that, historically, Africa west and south of Egypt was known as Aethiopia. Nowadays the classical use of the term has become obsolete. Also the nation of Ethiopia, then known as Abyssinia, is located nowhere near its namesake body of water but in the opposite eastern end of Africa which is much closer to the Indian Ocean and its subset the Red Sea.

History

Ancient Greek historians Diodorus and Palaephatus mentioned that the Gorgons lived in the Gorgades, islands in the Aethiopian Sea. The main island was called Cerna and, according to Henry T. Riley, these islands may correspond to Cape Verde.

On 16th century maps, the name of the Northern Atlantic Ocean was Sinus Occidentalis, while the central Atlantic, southwest of present-day Liberia, appeared as Sinus Atlanticus and the Southern Atlantic as Mare Aethiopicum. 

By the 17th century John Seller divided the Atlantic Ocean in two parts by means of the equator. He named the northern portion of the Atlantic "Mar del Nort" and the southern part "Oceanus Æthiopicus" in his Atlas Maritimus published in 1672. Edward Wright did not label the North Atlantic at all but called the portion south of the equator the "Aethiopian Sea" in a map that was published posthumously in 1683. John Thornton used the term in "A New Map of the World" from 1703.

Decades after the terms Ethiopian Ocean or Ethiopian Sea had fallen into disuse to refer to the Southern Atlantic Ocean, botanist William Albert Setchell (1864–1943) used the term for the sea around certain islands close to Antarctica.

See also
Ethiopia (mythology)
Gorgons

References

External links

Transactions and Proceedings of the Royal Society of New Zealand 1868-1961
Anais do Museu Paulista: História e Cultura Material - Do oceano dos clássicos aos mares dos impérios: transformações cartográficas do Atlântico sul
"Tekeli-li" or Hollow Earth Lives: A Bibliography of Antarctic Fiction
Pomponius Mela, de Chorographia Liber Primus
BBC - Mapping Africa

History of the Atlantic Ocean
History of cartography
Oceanography
History of geography
Ancient Greek geography
Bodies of water of Africa